Bloodstone is the first studio album by the Australian singer-songwriter Russell Morris. It was released in September 1971 and peaked at number 12 on the Australian Go-Set chart.

The album won the Best Album award at the 1971 King of Pop Awards.

Critical reception
The Australian music journalist Ian McFarlane wrote, "Bloodstone featured singer-song writer rock mixed with folk and US West Coast country-rock influences and with Morris having written every track..... It featured an all-star cast of session players from the upper echelons of the then current Aussie rock fraternity..... The front cover presented a design by artist Geoff Pendelbury, one of those impressionistic art pieces that were fashionable back in the day but seem to be too esoteric and oblique to have any real significance or impact now..... Bloodstone is somewhat more down-home and modest without losing sight of certain lofty intentions. Song titles such as 'Saints and Sinners', 'Our Hero is Dead', 'Heaven Shines', 'The Cell' and 'Ride Your Chariot' bear the brush of an earnest and serious young artist finding his way in an already established world of adult contemporary pop-rock. At least Morris was willing to take up the challenge and his efforts did result in one of the best local albums of the year..... There are some basic themes running throughout the album with the original Side One of the vinyl being the uptempo side while Side Two was the big ballad side."

Track listing

Charts
Bloodstone debuted at number 19, before peaking at number 12 in its third week on 25 September 1971.

Credits
 Guitar – Phil Manning, Rick Springfield
 Harmonica – Matt Taylor
 Piano – Brian Cadd, Warren Morgan

References

Russell Morris albums
1971 debut albums
EMI Records albums